"Now or Never" is a song by American singer Halsey from her second studio album Hopeless Fountain Kingdom (2017). It was released on April 4, 2017, through Astralwerks as the lead single with its music video being released simultaneously, as an instant grat with the album's pre-order. Halsey co-wrote the song with Starrah and its producers Cashmere Cat, Happy Perez, and Benny Blanco. It is a pop and dark pop song that also incorporates R&B.

Commercially, "Now or Never" reached the top twenty of Australia, Malaysia, and the US. It was certified 2× Platinum in the US.

Background
Halsey announced on March 7, 2017, the release month and title of her second studio album Hopeless Fountain Kingdom, set for release in June. She opted for a more mainstream-oriented sound for the album, saying: "I am more than capable of writing radio music and hopefully I'll put my money where my mouth is on this album."
The single was announced alongside the reveal of the cover through Halsey's social media accounts a day before its official release.

Composition

"Now or Never" was written by Halsey and Starrah alongside producers Cashmere Cat, Happy Perez and Benny Blanco. This later also served as her "therapist in a weird way" during the recording process. She stated: "We'd finish the track and then be ready to go, and he'd (Blanco) be like, 'Hey, I heard that thing you sang. Are you OK?'. It was kind of like he was hearing a cry for help in what I was singing, which was cool because it made us bond." The song has been described as a pop, dark pop, and R&B slow jam. Lyrically, it sees Halsey offering a lover an ultimatum to love her "now or never".

The song is composed in a key of F-sharp minor.

Critical reception

“Now or Never” met with mixed reviews from music critics. In the context of following her successful pop collaboration with the Chainsmokers, "Closer", Jon Caramanica in The New York Times opined "Now or Never" is "worrisome; it's among her least vocally present songs (with a couple of blatant Rihanna-isms to boot), and moves at a slow, neutered creep. And it's deeply effective, even if it's not deeply Halsey." Billboard editor Jason Lipshutz wrote that the song "doesn't have the massive chorus of "Closer"—its hook, widely compared to Rihanna's "Needed Me," simmers and never detonates—but the song possesses the type of slow tempo and vulnerable vocal delivery that has worked for recent hits like Julia Michaels' "Issues" and Khalid's "Location." Brittany Spanos of Rolling Stone thought Halsey "embraces a more sensual sound," moving away from the "industrial-leaning alternative pop" of her debut album Badlands. Anna Caga of Spin wrote that it "sounds like someone left a can of Rihanna's 'Needed Me' on the counter until it went flat."

Music video
The music video was directed by Halsey with Sing J Lee, marking the singer's directorial debut. It was shot in Mexico City. Inspired by Baz Luhrmann's 1996 film Romeo + Juliet, the video is filled with gun violence. Halsey talked about the video's plot in a statement, saying: "[It] is one part in the centre of a long narrative that tells the story of two people in love despite the forces trying to keep them apart. On its own, the song is about two impatient young lovers, but in the context of the Hopeless Fountain Kingdom universe, the stakes are much higher for these two star-crossed lovers".

Live performances 
Halsey performed "Now or Never" live on Jimmy Fallon on May 4, 2017. Later that month she also performed the song live at the 2017 Billboard Music Awards. In June 2017, she performed "Now or Never" live on The Late Show with Stephen Colbert.

Track listings
Digital download
"Now or Never" – 3:34

Digital download – R3hab Remix
"Now or Never"  – 3:04

Charts

Weekly charts

Year-end charts

Certifications

Release history

References

2017 singles
2017 songs
Astralwerks singles
Capitol Records singles
Halsey (singer) songs
Songs written by Halsey (singer)
Songs written by Benny Blanco
Songs written by Cashmere Cat
Songs written by Happy Perez
Songs written by Starrah
Song recordings produced by Benny Blanco
Song recordings produced by Cashmere Cat